Rodrigo Cárdenas, O.P. (died 1661) was a Roman Catholic prelate who served as Bishop of Nueva Segovia (1650–1661).

Biography
Rodrigo Cárdenas was ordained a priest in the Order of Preachers.
On 30 May 1650, he was appointed during the papacy of Pope Innocent X as Bishop of Nueva Segovia.
On 28 May 1651, he was consecrated bishop by Miguel de Poblete Casasola, Archbishop of Manila.
On 22 Jul 1653, he was installed as Bishop of Nueva Segovia.
He served as Bishop of Nueva Segovia until his death in May 1661. 
While bishop, he was the principal co-consecrator of Juan Merlo de la Fuente, Bishop of Comayagua (1651).

References 

17th-century Roman Catholic bishops in the Philippines
Bishops appointed by Pope Innocent X
1661 deaths
People from Vigan